Felipe Sholl Machado (Rio de Janeiro, April 5, 1982) is a Brazilian screenwriter and film director.

Filmography

Awards 

 Best Film for The Other End at the Rio de Janeiro International Film Festival (2016)
Best Adapted Screenplay for M8 Quando a Morte Socorre a Vida at the Cinema Brazil Grand Prize (2021)
 Best Screenplay for Hoje at the Brasília Film Festival (2011)
 Teddy Award (Best Short) for Tá at the Berlinale (2008)

References 

1982 births
Living people
People from Rio de Janeiro (city)
Brazilian film directors